John Edward Altobelli (May 8, 1963 – January 26, 2020) was an American college baseball coach who worked for 27 seasons at Orange Coast College in Costa Mesa, California. During his career, he led the Pirates to four California state junior college titles and in 2019 was named National Coach of the Year by the American Baseball Coaches Association.

Altobelli and eight other people, including his wife Keri, daughter Alyssa, former professional basketball player Kobe Bryant and Bryant's daughter, Gianna, died in a helicopter crash in Calabasas, California, on January 26, 2020.

Early life and education
John Altobelli was born in Chicago, Illinois on May 8, 1963. He was the sixth of seven children. His father, Jim Altobelli, was a professional baseball player.

Altobelli graduated from Newport Harbor High School in Newport Beach, California. He enrolled at Golden West College, where he played college baseball for the Golden West Rustlers as an outfielder. He transferred to the University of Houston, where he finished his college baseball career with the Houston Cougars from 1984 to 1985 and was a captain on the baseball team. In 1984, his junior season, Altobelli led the Cougars in runs batted in (34), runs scored (47), and triples (three). He shared leads in doubles (14) and stolen bases (eight). As a senior in 1985, Altobelli had a single-season record 57 walks and led the team in runs scored (68) and stolen bases (13).

After his senior season, Altobelli played briefly in the 1985 season for the Miami Marlins of the Florida State League, which at that time was an independent full-season Class A team. Altobelli returned to school after playing only 15 games. He graduated from the University of Houston with a bachelor's degree in physical education in 1987. In 1988, he earned his master's degree in education from Azusa Pacific University.

Coaching career
Altobelli began his coaching career in 1986 as junior varsity coach at Newport Harbor High School. In 1987, he returned to Houston as an assistant baseball coach. From 1988 to 1992, Altobelli was an assistant coach at UC Irvine under Mike Gerakos.

Two months after UC Irvine cut its baseball team for budgetary reasons, Altobelli became head coach at Orange Coast College in July 1992. Altobelli led the Orange Coast Pirates to state championships in 2009, 2014, 2015, and 2019. He won his 700th career game in 2019. He was named National Coach of the Year for the Pacific Association Division by the American Baseball Coaches Association in 2019. In 27 seasons as Orange Coast head coach, Altobelli had a cumulative 705–478–4 record.

For three summer seasons between 2012 and 2014, Altobelli served as head coach for the Brewster Whitecaps in the Cape Cod Baseball League. Among his players were Aaron Judge of the New York Yankees, Jeff McNeil of the New York Mets, and Ryon Healy of the Milwaukee Brewers.

Personal life
Altobelli and his first wife, Barbara Jean WooSam, had one son, John James (J.J.). J.J. played college baseball for the Oregon Ducks before playing professionally for the Johnson City Cardinals, and later became a scout for the Boston Red Sox. Altobelli and his second wife, Keri L. Sanders, had two daughters, Alexis and Alyssa.

Altobelli underwent open heart surgery in December 2012.

Death

Altobelli died on January 26, 2020, when the helicopter he was traveling in crashed in Calabasas, California. All nine passengers on board were killed, including Altobelli's wife Keri, the Altobellis' 14-year-old daughter Alyssa, former professional basketball player Kobe Bryant, Bryant's 13-year-old daughter Gianna, Sarah Chester, Chester's 13-year-old daughter Payton, Mamba Sports Academy assistant coach Christina Mauser, and helicopter pilot Ara Zobayan. Alyssa Altobelli, Gianna Bryant, and Payton Chester were teammates on the Mamba Sports Academy basketball team. The group were traveling to Mamba Sports Academy in Thousand Oaks for a basketball tournament when the helicopter crashed.

Altobelli and Kobe Bryant became friends through their daughters and had previously traveled to practices and games together. Altobelli invited Bryant to speak to his baseball team in 2018. Orange Coast College associate baseball coach Nate Johnson said of Altobelli, "He kind of gets overshadowed by Kobe a little bit, but he was his own Kobe of the junior college baseball world".

Like all of the other passengers, Altobelli's cause of death was blunt trauma.

Legacy
On January 26, 2022, two years after the crash, the baseball stadium at Orange Coast College was renamed  to John Altobelli Park.

References

External links

1963 births
2020 deaths
Accidental deaths in California
Azusa Pacific University alumni
Baseball players from California
Baseball players from Chicago
Cape Cod Baseball League coaches
Golden West College alumni
Golden West Rustlers baseball players
Houston Cougars baseball players
Miami Marlins (FSL) players
Orange Coast Pirates baseball coaches
Sportspeople from Newport Beach, California
UC Irvine Anteaters baseball coaches
University of Houston alumni
Victims of aviation accidents or incidents in 2020
Victims of helicopter accidents or incidents in the United States